Turnersville is an unincorporated community in Coryell County, Texas, United States, approximately  west of Waco and  north-northeast of Gatesville. As of 2004, the estimated population was 350.

Geography

The town sits approximately two miles southwest of the intersection of Farm Road 217 and Farm Road 182. The Middle Bosque River flows through the center of town while Goldy's Branch flows just north of town; the two branches come together less than a half mile east of the community and continue east-southeast to Lake Waco.

History

Turnersville was founded in the 1860s. The Chisholm Trail and Bosque Trail historically passed through the area. The Lone Tree, one of the oldest landmarks in Coryell County, located two miles east of the townsite, helped to guide travelers, settlers, and cattle drivers to Buchanan Springs, a spring-fed water supply on the open prairie; it still stood as of 2004. The town that eventually developed at this spring, where all travelers camped, was named after Cal Turner, a blacksmith who settled there to shoe horses and repair wagons. His blacksmith shop was the first business in town.

By 1868, the original Presbyterian church also served the community as a school. A post office opened in Turnersville in 1875. The first postmaster was Joseph M. Black, who later donated five acres of land for a cemetery. In 1885, Turnersville had a population of 300, served by a school, three churches, a gristmill, a cotton gin, and eight other businesses. A Masonic lodge was established the same year. The town's economy was based primarily on shipping grain and cotton. Turnersville prospered from 1895 to around 1916, largely because of the local cotton economy. Throughout the 20th century, however, the Turnersville population steadily declined. In 1916, it had 162 residents, numerous churches, and some ten businesses, and was home to a local newspaper known as the Advance. The school was closed in 1968 and the post office in 1987, but a new fire station was built in 1988. By 1989, the town reported 155 residents and four businesses.

Today, Turnersville still has an active cemetery association, which sponsors an annual homecoming on the Sunday before Memorial Day. The town is still home to a seed and fertilizer company, a construction company, a grain elevator, a community center, several local farms and ranches, and the last active church in town, the Baptist Church. Schoolchildren from Turnersville currently attend either the Jonesboro ISD or the Gatesville ISD. There is an active mission to renovate the community center and the old high school building. The 1916 Turnersville Elementary School was acquired and leveled in order to move forward with the next phase of this project which now includes a new building of approximately 6000 square feet.

The Cemetery was recently designated a historic cemetery. The historic marker reads as follows:

Geology

Turnersville sits on the Washita geological group. Major formations within the area include Buda limestone, Del Rio clay, and Georgetown limestone, including beds equivalent to Kiamichi clay at the base.

References

Unincorporated communities in Coryell County, Texas
Unincorporated communities in Texas